Butterfield Canyon may refer to:

 Butterfield Canyon, a canyon in the Angeles National Forest in Los Angeles County, California, United States, near the San Gabriel Reservoir
 Butterfield Canyon, a canyon in the Unorganized Borough, Alaska, United States, north of the city of Nome
 Butterfield Canyon, a canyon in the southern Coke County, Texas, United States, north of the city of San Angelo
 Butterfield Canyon (Utah), a canyon in the Oquirrh Mountains in southwest Salt Lake County, Utah, United States
 Left Hand Fork Butterfield Canyon